Polish & Slavic Federal Credit Union (PSFCU) is a federally insured, state-chartered, credit union with over 108,000 primary members, serving over 120,000 people. PSFCU has 21 branches in New York, New Jersey, Illinois and Pennsylvania. PSFCU is the largest ethnic credit union in the United States.

History
The Polish & Slavic Federal Credit Union was chartered in 1976 by the founders by Rev. Longin Tolczyk and members of the Polish & Slavic Center. In creating the PSFCU, the founders intended to help immigrants who were turned down by traditional banks. The bank was originally called the Industrial and Commercial Federal Credit Union, and was referred to as such in its first charter. In 1979, the credit union adopted its current name.

The first office of the credit union was established on 940 Manhattan Avenue in Greenpoint, Brooklyn, adjacent to the Polish & Slavic Center. In 1981, the PSFCU moved its headquarters to 140 Greenpoint Avenue.

In 1987, the first New Jersey branch was opened in Union, followed by rapid expansion over the New York City metropolitan area. In 2007, PSFCU established an ATM at the American Czestochowa in Doylestown, Pennsylvania. In 2010, the PSFCU started its expansion into Illinois with branches in Norridge, Mt. Prospect, Bridgeview and Schaumburg. In January 2019, the Polish & Slavic Federal Credit Union opened its first branch in the state of Pennsylvania, in the town of Stroudsburg.

The Polish & Slavic Federal Credit Union is the largest sponsor of the annual Pulaski Day Parade in New York City.

Membership
Anyone can become a member of the Polish & Slavic Federal Credit Union. Upon electing to open an account at the PSFCU, the individual can also select to become a "sponsoring member" of the Polish & Slavic Center, Polish Cultural Foundation, Polonia of Long Island, Polish Supplementary School Council of America, General Pulaski Memorial Parade Committee, Alliance of Polish Clubs in the United States, Polish Highlanders Alliance of North America, Kosciuszko Foundation, Copernicus Foundation, or Polish Army Veterans Association of America. Previously, only persons of Polish or Slavic descent could become a member of the federal credit union, however that rule has since been changed and membership is open to all persons willing to join, regardless of ethnicity.

Services
Polish & Slavic Federal Credit Union offers these services:
Checking Accounts and related, including debit cards
Savings Accounts
Certificates of Deposit
IRAs
Consumer loans of all kinds
Lines of credit (LOC)
Credit cards
Auto loans: Car loans, motorcycle loans, etc.
Home equity loans and Home equity lines of credit
Mortgages
Federally Insured Student loans
Direct Deposit
Home banking - initially offered in 2007

References

External links
Official website

Companies based in Brooklyn
Banks established in 1979
Credit unions based in New Jersey
Credit unions based in New York (state)
Social entrepreneurship in the United States